Comical may refer to:
 Comedy, a genre of fiction intended to be humorous
 Comical Radio, a weekly comedy radio show in New York City